The 154th Massachusetts General Court, consisting of the Massachusetts Senate and the Massachusetts House of Representatives, met in 1945 and 1946 during the governorship of Maurice J. Tobin. Arthur W. Coolidge served as president of the Senate and Frederick Willis served as speaker of the House.

Senators

Representatives

See also
 1946 Massachusetts gubernatorial election
 79th United States Congress
 List of Massachusetts General Courts

References

Further reading

External links

 
 
 
 

Political history of Massachusetts
Massachusetts legislative sessions
massachusetts
1945 in Massachusetts
massachusetts
1946 in Massachusetts